The El Faro Towers ( "Lighthouse Towers"), also known as El Faro I/II, when referring to the complex individually, or El Faro Complex, when referring to the pair as a whole, are a highrise residential complex of two, twin interconnected skyscrapers located in the neighborhood of Puerto Madero, in Buenos Aires, the capital and largest city of Argentina. The El Faro Towers are made of glass, most specially used for the skyscraper's windows, and reinforced concrete. Although the two towers did not commence their construction at the same time, the first and second skyscrapers' construction ceased in 2003 and 2005, respectively. The twin skyscrapers were the tallest structures in Buenos Aires, and Argentina from 2003 to 2009.

History

Concept and construction 
The Lighthouse project was first proposed in 1999, and coincided with a burgeoning interest in redeveloping the dilapidated Puerto Madero docklands on the part of developers. The project was initially designed to include two towers with a height of  each, with 48 floors distributed among them. The towers were to be connected by several aerial bridges at four levels.

The first tower's construction was completed in 2003, and all units therein were sold by the time construction started on the second tower. While there were several alternative proposals from groups dedicated to the protection of the nearby Buenos Aires Ecological Reserve, objections were also raised over the prior substitution of Act 123 for Act 452, which would have permitted a lesser degree of environmental impact for the project's approval. The second tower was completed in the early months in 2005 and promptly sold out, thus concluding the project. These became the highest in Buenos Aires and Argentina, though the structures were narrowly surpassed in height by the nearby Mulieris towers and the Repsol-YPF tower (both in Puerto Madero) upon these latter's compilation in 2008 (they were, in turn, surpassed by Torre Cavia, part of the Le Parc Figueroa Alcorta complex, in 2009).

Geography 
The El Faro Towers are located in the neighborhood of Puerto Madero, in Buenos Aires, the capital and largest city of Argentina. The twin skyscrapers is surrounded by numerous attractions in the area, including several restaurants, a cathedral, a park, several markets and an antique market, a subway, a bookstore and several other stores found nearby, several residential and commercial buildings, since the El Faro Towers themselves are a part of a residential neighborhood, a notable river with a complete set of docks and ferry piers and a natural reserve not far from the skyscrapers.

Structure and features 
The twin skyscrapers were built using reinforced concrete for general support and the towers' walls. The pair of skyscrapers uses glass for the towers' symmetrically designed windows. Aluminum is also used. The two skyscrapers are linked and intertwined together by four sky bridges. The complex houses a total of 160 apartments, outdoor pools, spa, sauna, gyms, tennis court, solarium, two underground parking structures for owners, residents and guests, and other ancillary facilities. A reading and relaxation room is also set up on the top sky bridge between the two buildings.

Gallery 
''Click on the thumbnail to enlarge.

See also 
Torre Cavia
Torre del Café
Torre de Herveo

References

External links 

El Faro I, Buenos Aires - SkyscraperPage.com
Torres el Faro, Buenos Aires - Interpon United Arab Emirates
Apartment El Faro Towers, Buenos Aires - ByT Argentina
Obras Metálicas S. A.

Buildings and structures in Buenos Aires
Residential buildings completed in 2005
Residential skyscrapers in Argentina
Twin towers